

Fagaceae
Castanea   
Castanea sativa   
Fagus   
Fagus orientalis   
Fagus sylvatica   
Quercus   
Quercus aucheri   
Quercus brantii   
Quercus cerris   
Quercus cerris var. austriaca   
Quercus cerris var. cerris   
Quercus coccifera   
Quercus frainetto   
Quercus hartwissiana   
Quercus ilex   
Quercus infectoria   
Quercus infectoria subsp. boissieri   
Quercus infectoria subsp. infectoria   
Quercus ithaburensis   
Quercus ithaburensis subsp. macrolepis   
Quercus libani   
Quercus macranthera   
Quercus macranthera subsp. syspirensis    - 
Quercus petraea   
Quercus petraea subsp. dschorochensis   
Quercus petraea subsp. iberica   
Quercus petraea subsp. petraea   
Quercus petraea subsp. pinnatiloba    - 
Quercus pontica   
Quercus pubescens   
Quercus robur   
Quercus robur subsp. pedunculiflora   
Quercus robur subsp. robur   
Quercus trojana   
Quercus virgiliana   
Quercus vulcanica    -

Images

External links

.
.